The ruddy mongoose (Urva smithii) is a mongoose species native to hill forests in India and Sri Lanka.

Description
The ruddy mongoose's fur is brownish and coarse, long in hindquarters, but short in other parts of the body. Tail constitute about 75-90 % of body length. It is distinguished by the Indian grey mongoose by its slightly larger size and jet black-tipped tail.

Distribution and habitat

The ruddy mongoose is mainly a forest-living animal and prefers more secluded areas. It has also been recorded in secluded paddy fields and in comparatively open fields.

Taxonomy
Herpestes smithii was the scientific name proposed by John Edward Gray in 1837 for a zoological specimen in the collection of the British Museum Natural History. All Asian mongooses are now thought to belong in the genus Urva.

Subspecies:
 U. s. smithii
 U. s. thysanurus
 U. s. zeylanius

Ecology and Behavior
It usually carries its black tipped tail tip curved upward which is visible from a distance. Like other mongooses, it hunts by day and by night, and feeds on birds, rat snakes, land monitors, rodents and snails. Generally a solitary animal, rarely can be seen in pairs during mating season. However, mother and pup family groups consisting about five animals have been observed. 

It is found in thick jungles, forest edges near paddy fields and tea estates. However, withdraw quickly in a crevice or underneath a rock shelf during human confrontation. When cornered, they fight fearlessly with loud and shrill cries.

In culture
In Sri Lanka this animal is usually regarded as an unlikable animal and a pest. The golden palm civet (Paradoxurus zeylonensis), altogether a different species endemic to Sri Lanka, is also called  due to similar appearance and coloration.

References

External links
 

Mammals described in 1837
Taxa named by John Edward Gray
Carnivorans of Asia
Mammals of India
Mammals of Sri Lanka
Urva (genus)